Jonathan Beard is an American orchestrator and composer for media and the concert stage. His credits include Us, The Handmaid's Tale, Despicable Me 3, and Star Wars: Battlefront II. Beard also works as an educator, and currently teaches at the UCLA Herb Alpert School of Music.

Background 
Beard finished Summerfield Waldorf School in Santa Rosa in 1999. He majored in musical composition at Stanford University, and received a master's degree from UCLA.

Career 
As a composer, Beard has worked on a variety of projects for chamber music, stage performances, and visual media. His composed the music for the documentary 3 Seconds in October - The Killing of Andy Lopez, which won the Emmy Award for Societal Concerns from the San Francisco/Northern California Chapter of the National Academy of Television Arts and Sciences. Other recent projects include his electroacoustic suite Ritual, his opera Cesare, Child of Night (OPERA UCLA premiere Fall 2021), the film scores to What Still Remains, Heavenquest, and Frank vs. God; and De tu puño y letra, an electronic video-sound collaboration with artist Suzanne Lacy. He has served on the composing teams for video games such as Star Wars: Battlefront I and II, and guest-composed for ABC's Once Upon a Time. For the stage, Beard co-composed the oratorio The Passion of Anne Frank for the Los Angeles Master Chorale as part of their Voices Within residency, and his original theatre-score for Driving Miss Daisy received an NAACP Theatre Award nomination.

As an orchestrator, Beard has collaborated with other composers on more than 100 film, TV, and video game titles, including Minions: The Rise of Gru, The Handmaid's Tale, King Richard, The Mandalorian, and God of War. He has worked extensively with composers such as Junkie XL (Alita: Battle Angel; Deadpool), Bear McCreary (Godzilla: King of the Monsters; 10 Cloverfield Lane), Pinar Toprak (Stargirl), Kris Bowers (Green Book), Michael Abels (Us, Nope), Heitor Pereira (Despicable Me 3), among others. He is the co-founder of Tutti Music Partners, a boutique orchestration firm that specializes in providing support to other composers throughout the industry.

Beard has often talked about his passion for musical color extending into synthesis and sound design. He has many hybrid and fully electronic projects to his name, including Cesare, Child Of Night; A Killer of Men; and his electroacoustic commission for the Pacific Symphony, Chaos in the Garden: A Rewrite of Spring.

In 2011 he joined the faculty at his alma mater, UCLA, where he teaches electronic music composition and music technology in the Herb Alpert School of Music. Beard has also worked extensively throughout the Los Angeles Area, working as co-conductor of the LA’s Best-ETM LA After-School Youth Orchestra, as a lecturer for the Cal State Northridge music department, and with the Pacific Symphony to help educate casual symphonic listeners about orchestration.

Works

References

External links 

 Official website

21st-century American composers
21st-century American male musicians
21st-century American pianists
American cellists
American music educators
Living people
1981 births
21st-century cellists